Mark Benson (born 1958) is an English former cricketer and umpire.

Mark Benson may also refer to:

Mark Benson (engineer), inventor of a supercritical boiler
Mark Benson (actor) in The Lost Boys
Marc Benson, soccer player in 2008 PDL season